The Willoughby–Baylor House is a historic home located at Norfolk, Virginia. It was built about 1794, and is a two-story, three-bay, brick detached townhouse with a gable roof. It features a Greek Revival style doorway and porch supported on two pairs of Greek Doric order columns. These features were added in the mid-1820s.  It was built by William Willoughby (1758-1800), a local merchant and building contractor.  The building is open as a historic house museum operated by the Chrysler Museum of Art.

It was listed on the National Register of Historic Places in 1971.

References

External links
The History of the Willoughby–Baylor House

Historic house museums in Virginia
Houses on the National Register of Historic Places in Virginia
Greek Revival houses in Virginia
Houses completed in 1794
Houses in Norfolk, Virginia
National Register of Historic Places in Norfolk, Virginia
1794 establishments in Virginia